The 1972 Buckeye Tennis Championships – Doubles was an event of the 1972 Buckeye Tennis Championships tennis tournament and was played at the Buckeye Boys Ranch in Grove City, Columbus, Ohio in the United States between July 17 and July 23, 1972. Jim Osborne and Jim McManus were the defending champions but were defeated in the semifinal. Jimmy Connors and Pancho Gonzales won the doubles title, defeating Robert McKinley and Dick Stockton in the final, 7–5, 6–3, 7–5.

Seeds

Draw

References

External links
 ITF tournament edition details

Buckeye Tennis Championships